Imperial Noble Consort Dunyi (惇怡皇貴妃 瓜爾佳氏; 3 December 1683 – 30 April 1768) was a consort of Kangxi Emperor. She was 29 years his junior. She outlived Empress Xiaoxianchun, the Hoifa-Nara Step Empress, and several Qianlong's consorts and children.

Life

Family background
Imperial Noble Consort Dunyi came from a prominent Manchu Plain White Banner Guwalgiya clan. Her personal name is unknown, while her milk name was Hanjiuchun (旱九春

 Father: Human (祜滿/祜满), served as third rank military official

Kangxi era
Lady Guwalgiya was born on 16th day of 10th lunar month of the 22nd year of Kangxi Emperor, which translates to 3 December 1683 in Gregorian calendar. In 1700, she entered Forbidden City at the age of seventeen, and was given the title of "Concubine He" (和嫔; "he" meaning "harmonious"). On 17 November 1701, she gave birth to the emperor's eighteenth daughter, who would die prematurely in the same month. In 1718, she was promoted to "Consort He" (和妃).

Yongzheng era
According to the tradition, each new emperor had to promote the concubines of his predecessor. Lady Guwalgiya was promoted to "Dowager Noble Consort He" (和贵太妃) in 1722, but the promotion ceremony was held in July 1724.

Qianlong era

In 1743, Lady Guwalgiya was promoted to "Dowager Imperial Noble Consort Wenhui" (温惠皇贵太妃; "wenhui" means "tender and kind"). Qianlong Emperor carried out two bows and six genuflexions, when she stood up and accepted a ceremony. Her residence in the Forbidden city was Jingfu palace (景福宫, Palace of Happy Scenery), one of the palaces in the area of Ningshou palace, a former palace of Empress Dowager. In 1763, Lady Guwalgiya celebrated her eightieth birthday. She received 9 rolls of Wuling Baotou, five-colored satin with azurites, one metre of silk with 8 golden roundels of dragons, 2 metres of brocade, 3 bags of gold pieces, one metre of satin with golden "shou" characters, 18 metres of dajuan satin, 9 metres of velvet, 9 metres of dajuan muslin, 9 metres of damask, 9 metres of spring silk, 9 metres of Puhuan crepe. She died at the age of eighty six in Jingfu palace on 30 April 1768. She was granted posthumous title "Imperial Noble consort Dunyi" (惇怡皇贵妃; "dunyi" meaning "honest and pleasant") in June 1768. She was the longest living consort of Kangxi Emperor.

Issue
 As Concubine He:
 18th princess (17 November 1701 – November 1701)

Titles
 During the reign of the Kangxi Emperor (r. 1661–1722):
 Lady Guwalgiya (from 3 December 1683)
 Concubine He (from 1700), fifth rank consort 
 Consort He (from 1718), fourth rank consort 
 During the reign of the Yongzheng Emperor (r. 1722–1735):
 Dowager Noble Consort He (from 1722)
 During the reign of the Qianlong Emperor (r. 1735–1796):
 Grand Dowager Imperial Noble Consort Wenhui (from 1743)
 Imperial Noble Consort Dunyi (from 1768)

See also
 Ranks of imperial consorts in China#Qing
 Royal and noble ranks of the Qing dynasty

References 

Consorts of the Kangxi Emperor
1683 births
1768 deaths